Michel Crépeau (30 October 1930, Fontenay-le-Comte, Vendée – 30 March 1999, Paris) was a French centre-left politician.

Born in 1930, barrister, he joined the Radical Party. When it split in 1972, he founded the Movement of Left Radicals (MRG) which chosen the alliance with the Socialist Party and the French Communist Party. Elected Mayor of La Rochelle in 1971, and Member of French National Assembly representing of Charente Maritime département in 1973, he kept these terms until his death in 1999.

MRG candidate in the 1981 presidential election, he obtained 2.2% of votes in the first round, then he called to vote for François Mitterrand in the second round. He became his Environment Minister from 1981 to 1983, then his Trade and Craft Industry Minister from 1983 to 1986. When Robert Badinter was nominated President of the Constitutional Council, in February 1986, he succeeded him as Justice Minister but the Left lost the legislative election one month later and, consequently, he was forced to resign.

Michel Crépeau died in Paris on 30 March 1999, after a heart attack which had arisen few days earlier during a parliamentary session of the National Assembly.

References

External links 
  Official biography on the French National Assembly's website

1930 births
1999 deaths
People from Fontenay-le-Comte
Politicians from Pays de la Loire
Radical Party (France) politicians
Radical Party of the Left politicians
French Ministers of Justice
French Ministers of Commerce and Industry
French Ministers of the Environment
Deputies of the 5th National Assembly of the French Fifth Republic
Deputies of the 6th National Assembly of the French Fifth Republic
Deputies of the 7th National Assembly of the French Fifth Republic
Deputies of the 8th National Assembly of the French Fifth Republic
Deputies of the 9th National Assembly of the French Fifth Republic
Deputies of the 11th National Assembly of the French Fifth Republic
Mayors of La Rochelle
Candidates in the 1981 French presidential election